Drew Deezy is a Samoan American rapper from San Jose, California. He has become a prominent rapper on the West Coast, as well as the New Zealand markets with hit singles such as "I Don't See Nothing Wrong". In 2010, Drew signed with 454 Life Entertainment and was featured in the label's compilation album "As Real As It Gets". He was featured in the July 2011 issue of Rip It Up magazine. And he coaches at San Jose Hitsquad

Discography

Albums 
2004: It's Our Time
2010: As Real As It Gets
2012: The Poly Tape
2015: The Poly Tape 2

Mixtapes/Street Albums
2011: Connected

Singles
2010: "We Get Money" Drew Deezy, Thai Viet G, Feat. Glasses Malone & Matt Blaque. Produced by Traxamillion
2010: "I Don't See Nothing Wrong" Drew Deezy, Thai Ngo, Feat. Bobby V.. Produced by Traxamillion
2012: "Go Gettah" Feat. Spawnbreezie
2012 "Come back to me" Feat. Fiji
2015 "50/50" Feat. Fiji & Tenelle

References

Musicians from San Jose, California
American people of Samoan descent
Crips
Rappers from the San Francisco Bay Area
Living people
21st-century American rappers
Year of birth missing (living people)